Acacia yirrkallensis is a shrub of the genus Acacia and the subgenus Plurinerves. It is native to the top end of the Northern Territory.

Description 
A. yirrkallensis is a resinous shrub to growing from 1 m to 2 m high. It can be erect or be lying flat on the ground and it branches near the ground. The bark is smooth, and a dark grey to dark brown. The smooth, brown/dark red-brown/yellowish  branchlets are angular and have  ridges which have minute resin crenulations. The straight to slightly curved, leathery  phyllodes are very narrowly elliptic, and  1.5–4.5 cm by 1.4–5.2 mm, and have prominent stomata, with 1 or more prominent veins and  indistinct parallel minor veins. Its globular yellow heads are 3–4.5 mm in diameter, with 10–13 flowers per head. The flowers are 5-merous and have a smooth, almost free calyx which is 0.9–1.1 mm long. The smooth corolla  is 1.4–1.6 mm long.  The woody, straight-sided, flat pods are oblanceolate, narrowing toward the base and  2–5 cm by 4–9 mm, and have oblique striations. Both the margins and the seed-partitions are prominent. The brown to dark brown seeds are 2.5–3.5 mm long. The stalk of the ovule expands to give a top-shaped aril.

It flowers from June to January, and fruits from February to October.

Habitat 
It usually grows in eucalypt forest and woodland on grey sandy podsols, on laterite and bauxite on stony sandstone ridges and gorges.

Distribution 
It is found in the Bioregions  of Arnhem Coast, Arnhem Plateau, Central Arnhem, Gulf Fall and Uplands, Pine Creek, and Tiwi Cobourg.

See also
 List of Acacia species

References

External links 
Acacia yirrkallensis WorldWideWattle

yirrkallensis
Flora of the Northern Territory
Plants described in 1958